Abu Salih as-Samman (died AH 101, CE 720) was an early Islamic scholar of Medinah. He was a narrator of Hadith is among the Tabi'un generation of Muslims.

Biography
He was born during the reign of Umar ibn Al-Khattab, and was the freed slave of Juwayriyya - the wife of the Prophet Muhammad. He resided in Medina and witnessed the siege of Uthman. He died in 101 AH at the end of the reign of Umar ibn Abd al-Aziz.

Teachers
He met many of the companions of Muhammad, and narrated hadith from:

 Sa'd ibn Abi Waqqas
 Aisha
 Abu Hurairah
 Abd Allah ibn Abbas
 Abd Allah ibn Umar ibn al-Khattab

Students
Some of the people who narrated from him include:
 Sohail ibn Abi Saleh (son)
 Sulaiman Al-A’mash
 Zayd ibn Aslam
 Abdullah ibn Dinar
 Ibn Shihab al-Zuhri

Reception
Ahmad ibn Hanbal said that he is considered Thiqa, (trustworthy in matters of hadith) and was greatly renowned and respected.

References

External links

 Biodata at MuslimScholars.info

Added more citations 

Hadith scholars
Tabi‘un hadith narrators
720 deaths